Prabodhkant Damodardas Pandya (1943/1944 – 22 August 2021) was an Indian politician from Gujarat.

Political career
Pandya was a member of Gujarat Legislative Assembly representing Santrampur constituency from 1985 to 1990 under Janata Party, 1990 to 1995 under Janata Dal and 2002 to 2007 under Bharatiya Janata Party (BJP). He had served as Minister of State for Home and Education departments under Chimanbhai Patel government. In 2012, he left BJP and joined Gujarat Parivartan Party (GPP). He contested 2012 Gujarat Legislative Assembly election from Lunawada constituency and lost.

He had worked for development of Nandinath Mahadev temple in Kadana Taluka of Gujarat.

Death
He died on 22 August 2021 at Ahmedabad at age of 77. He was cremated at his native, Jaguna Muvada village in Kadana Taluka.

References

1940s births
2021 deaths
People from Mahisagar district
Chief ministers from Janata Party
Gujarat MLAs 1985–1990
Gujarat MLAs 1990–1995
Gujarat MLAs 2002–2007
Bharatiya Janata Party politicians from Gujarat
Janata Party politicians
Janata Dal politicians
Gujarat Parivartan Party politicians
Date of birth missing